David Adetayo Olusoga  (born January 1970) is a British historian, writer, broadcaster, presenter and film-maker. He is Professor of Public History at the University of Manchester. He has presented historical documentaries on the BBC and contributed to The One Show and The Guardian.

Early life and education
David Olusoga was born in Lagos, Nigeria, to a Nigerian father and British mother. At five years old, Olusoga migrated to the UK with his mother and grew up in Gateshead, Tyne and Wear. He was one of a very few non-white people living on a council estate. By the time he was 14, the National Front had allegedly attacked his house on more than one occasion, requiring police protection for him and his family. They were allegedly eventually forced to leave as a result of the racism. He later attended the University of Liverpool to study the history of slavery, and in 1994, graduated with a BA (Hons) History degree, followed by a postgraduate course in broadcast journalism at Leeds Trinity University.

Career and recognition 
Olusoga began his television career as a researcher on the 1999 BBC series Western Front. He became a producer of history programmes after university, working from 2005 on programmes such as Namibia: Genocide and the Second Reich, The Lost Pictures of Eugene Smith and Abraham Lincoln: Saint or Sinner?.

Subsequently he became a television presenter, beginning in 2014 with The World's War: Forgotten Soldiers of Empire, about the Indian, African and Asian troops who fought in the First World War, followed by other documentaries and appearances on BBC One television's The One Show. In 2015 it was announced that he would co-present Civilisations, a sequel to Kenneth Clark's 1969 television documentary series Civilisation, alongside the historians Mary Beard and Simon Schama. His most recent TV series include Black and British: A Forgotten History, The World's War, A House Through Time and the BAFTA award-winning Britain’s Forgotten Slave Owners.

Olusoga has written stand-alone history books as well as those accompanying his television series. He is the author of the 2016 book Black and British: A Forgotten History, which was awarded both the Longman–History Today Trustees Award 2017 and the PEN Hessell-Tiltman Prize 2017. His other books include The World’s War, which won First World War Book of the Year in 2015, The Kaiser’s Holocaust: Germany’s Forgotten Genocide and the Colonial Roots of Nazism (2011) which he co-authored with Casper Erichsen, and Civilisations (2018). He contributed to the Oxford Companion to Black British History, and has written for The Guardian, The Observer, New Statesman and BBC History magazine; since June 2018 he has been a member of the board of the Scott Trust, which publishes The Guardian.

Olusoga was included in the 2019 and 2020 editions of the Powerlist, a ranking of the 100 most influential Black Britons, and in the 2021 edition he made the Top 10 most influential, ranking eighth.

He was appointed an Officer of the Order of the British Empire (OBE) in the 2019 New Year Honours for services to history and to community integration. He received his medal from King Charles III in February 2023.

On appointing him as a professor in 2019, the University of Manchester described him as an expert on military history, empire, race and slavery, and "one of the UK's foremost historians". Olusoga gave his inaugural professorial lecture on "Identity, Britishness and the Windrush" at the University of Manchester in May 2019.

In response to the global Black Lives Matter movement with protests after the murder of George Floyd, Olusoga's Black and British: A Forgotten History was re-broadcast. along with Britain's Forgotten Slave Owners, also fronted by him.

On 13 November 2020, the BBC announced that it had commissioned Barack Obama Talks To David Olusoga, a special programme in which Barack Obama discusses the first volume of his presidential memoirs, A Promised Land. The programme aired on 19 January 2021.

In January 2021 Olusoga appeared on BBC Radio 4's Desert Island Discs. 

In December 2021, it was announced that Olusoga had been awarded the President's Medal, by the British Academy. Olusoga is the 39th person to receive the medal, which has been awarded since 2010, and recognises services to the humanities and social sciences. Previous recipients include Margaret Atwood, Jimmy Wales and Hilary Mantel.

Awards and honours
2021: President's Medal, British Academy, for services to humanities and social sciences
2019: Appointed Officer of the Order of the British Empire in the 2019 New Year Honours for services to history and to community integration
2019: Honorary Degree of Doctor of Laws, University of Leicester
2018: Honorary Degree of Doctor of Letters, University of Leeds
2017: Honorary Degree of Doctor of Letters, University of Liverpool
2017: PEN Hessell-Tiltman Prize for Black and British
2017: Longman–History Today Trustees Award for Black and British
2016: Specialist Factual BAFTA, BAFTA TV Awards for Britain’s Forgotten Slave Owners
2015: Royal Historical Society Public History Prize for Broadcasting for Britain’s Forgotten Slave Owners (BBC History)
2015: World War One Book of the Year at the Paddy Power Political Book Awards for The World's War

Filmography
 The World's War: Forgotten Soldiers of Empire (2014)
 Fighting for King and Empire: Britain's Caribbean Heroes (2015)
 The One Show (various episodes)
 Britain's Forgotten Slave Owners (2015)
 Black and British: A Forgotten History (2016)
 Timewatch: "British Empire – Heroes and Villains" and "Dictators and Despots" (both 2017)
 Civilisations (two of nine episodes, "First Contact" and "The Cult of Progress") (2018)
 A House Through Time (2018–2021)
 The Unwanted: The Secret Windrush Files (2019)
 Statue Wars: One Summer in Bristol (2021)
 Our NHS: A Hidden History (2021)

Books
The Kaiser's Holocaust: Germany's Forgotten Genocide and the Colonial Roots of Nazism (Faber and Faber, 2011);  (with Casper W. Erichsen)
The World's War (Head of Zeus, 2015); 
Black and British: A Forgotten History (Macmillan, 2016); 
Civilisations: First Contact/The Cult of Progress (Profile Books, 2018); 
The Black History Book: Big Ideas Simply Explained (DK, 2021);

References

External links
 Akbar, Arifa. "David Olusoga: ‘There’s a dark side to British history, and we saw a flash of it this summer’" (interview), The Guardian, 4 November 2016. Retrieved 4 May 2021.

1970 births
Living people
21st-century British historians
Academics of the University of Manchester
Alumni of Leeds Trinity University
Alumni of the University of Liverpool
Black British academics
Black British history
Black British television personalities
Black British writers
British broadcasters
British military historians
British television presenters
Historians of World War I
Historians of World War II
Nigerian emigrants to the United Kingdom
Nigerian people of British descent
Officers of the Order of the British Empire
People associated with the University of Leeds
People associated with the University of Leicester
People from Gateshead
Writers from Tyne and Wear
Television personalities from Lagos
Writers from Lagos
Yoruba academics
Yoruba historians
Yoruba television personalities
Yoruba writers
21st-century British male writers